Petr Novák is a paralympic athlete from the Czech Republic competing mainly in category T11 sprints events.

Petr competed in the 100m and 200m at both the 1996 and 2000 Summer Paralympics winning the silver medal in the 100m in 2000.

References

Paralympic athletes of the Czech Republic
Athletes (track and field) at the 1996 Summer Paralympics
Athletes (track and field) at the 2000 Summer Paralympics
Paralympic silver medalists for the Czech Republic
Living people
Medalists at the 2000 Summer Paralympics
Year of birth missing (living people)
Paralympic medalists in athletics (track and field)
Czech male sprinters
Visually impaired sprinters
Paralympic sprinters
Blind people
Czech people with disabilities